The 2008 Mountain West Conference baseball tournament took place from May 20 through 24. The top six regular season finishers of the league's seven teams met in the double-elimination tournament held at Texas Christian University's Lupton Stadium. Top seeded TCU won their third straight and third overall Mountain West Conference Baseball Championship with a championship game score of 15–2 and earned the conference's automatic bid to the 2008 NCAA Division I baseball tournament.

Seeding 
The top six finishers from the regular season were seeded one through six based on conference winning percentage only. Only six teams participate, so Air Force was not in the field. New Mexico claimed the second seed over San Diego State by winning the season series. BYU claimed the fourth seed by winning the season series over Utah.

Results

All-Tournament Team

Most Valuable Player 
Clint Arnold, an outfielder for the champion TCU Horned Frogs, was named the tournament Most Valuable Player.

References 

Tournament
Mountain West Conference baseball tournament
Mountain West Conference baseball tournament
Mountain West Conference baseball tournament
Baseball in the Dallas–Fort Worth metroplex
Sports competitions in Fort Worth, Texas